Holland–Summers House was a historic home located near Harmony, Iredell County, North Carolina.  It was built in 1850, and is a two-story, five bay, "L"-shaped Greek Revival style brick dwelling.  It has a low hipped roof and the front facade features a colonnade of white cement Doric order pilasters.  Also on the property is a contributing heavy timber frame smokehouse.

It was added to the National Register of Historic Places in 1980.

References

Houses on the National Register of Historic Places in North Carolina
Greek Revival houses in North Carolina
Houses completed in 1850
Houses in Iredell County, North Carolina
National Register of Historic Places in Iredell County, North Carolina